Oberleutnant Georg Kenzian Edler von Kenzianshausen followed his father's profession of arms, and served the Austro-Hungarian Empire during World War I. He became a fighter ace, scoring eight aerial victories. After the dissolution of Austria-Hungary in the aftermath of World War I, he became a citizen of German Austria and defended his new nation against invasion.

Early life and service
Georg Kenzian Edler von Kenzianshausen was born in Linz, Austria in 1894. He was the son of an army officer, and had aspirations of following his father's profession. In 1913, Kenzian joined Engineer Battalion Nr. 2 of the Austro-Hungarian Army. By the time World War I began, he had been commissioned as an officer; he went into action against the Russians. He was wounded on 18 December 1914. After healing, he returned to the Engineers and was promoted to Oberleutnant in September 1915. Shortly after this, he volunteered for the Luftfahrtruppen.

World War I aerial service
Beginning in February 1916, Kenzian trained as an aerial observer and in April was posted to Fliegerkompanie 24 at the Pergine Valsugana Airfield on the South Tyrol front. On 16 June 1916, Kenzian scored his first victory. After a second win, while manning the gun in the rear seat of József Kiss's Hansa-Brandenburg two-seater, Kenzian and his pilot were shot down and wounded on 27 July. It took Kenzian three months to recuperate; during this period, he was awarded the Order of the Iron Crown Third Class with War Decoration and Swords.

In the midst of February 1917, Kenzian was assigned to the aviation school at Wiener-Neustadt in the dual capacities of student pilot and aerial observer instructor. By July, he was qualified as a pilot, having earned Austrian Pilot's Certificate number 721 on the 12th. In August, he was packed off to Fliegerkompanie 55J as its deputy commander under Josef von Maier. Kenzian would score seven more victories while with Flik 55J, and be awarded the Gold Bravery Medal for Officers and the Military Merit Cross, Third Class. The squadron would serve so well at Haidenschaft and Pergine that it was dubbed the Kaiser Staffel (Emperor's Squadron).

On 4 May 1918, Karl Patzelt's death in action left Fliegerkompanie 68J leaderless. Kenzian was granted command of the fighter squadron at Colle Umberto and led it into combat over the Battle of the Piave in June. He won the Silver Military Merit Medal with Swords. In October 1918, he was transferred to command of Fliegerkompanie 42J at Pinzano when its commander was KIA, and led it until war's end.

Post World War I
As the war ended, Kenzian switched his fighting efforts to repelling Slovenians invading Carinthia in southern Austria; he served with the German-Austrian Republic aerial forces until the conflict ended in June 1919. He found himself flying general service again, dropping leaflets, observing enemy movements, dropping bombs, and intercepting opposing aircraft. The Treaty of Saint Germain in September 1919 not only ended the conflict, but also the German-Austrian air arm.

Kenzian died of a heart attack in Vienna in 1953.

List of aerial victories
Numbered victories are confirmed. Unconfirmed victories are noted by "u/c".

See also
 Aerial victory standards of World War I

Endnotes

References

1894 births
1953 deaths
Austro-Hungarian World War I flying aces
Edlers of Austria